Lorenzo Gherardi (1645–1727) was a Roman Catholic prelate who served as Bishop of Recanati e Loreto (1693–1727).

Biography
Lorenzo Gherardi was born in Monte Alboddo, Italy on 10 August 1645. On 8 June 1693, he was appointed during the papacy of Pope Innocent XII as Bishop of Recanati e Loreto. On 14 June 1693, he was consecrated bishop by Galeazzo Marescotti, Cardinal-Priest of Santi Quirico e Giulitta, with Prospero Bottini, Titular Archbishop of Myra, and Sperello Sperelli, Bishop of Terni, serving as co-consecrators. He served as Bishop of Recanati e Loreto until his death on 5 April 1727.

References

External links and additional sources
 (for Chronology of Bishops) 
 (for Chronology of Bishops) 

17th-century Italian Roman Catholic bishops
18th-century Italian Roman Catholic bishops
Bishops appointed by Pope Innocent XII
1645 births
1727 deaths